The 2008 United States Senate election in Oregon was held on November 4, 2008. Incumbent Republican U.S. Senator Gordon H. Smith sought reelection to a third term. Smith was the only Republican Senator from the West Coast (excluding Alaska) and the only Republican holding statewide office in Oregon. He was opposed by Democrat Jeff Merkley, the Speaker of the Oregon House of Representatives, and David Brownlow of the Constitution Party of Oregon. Merkley won by a narrow margin, with Smith not conceding until two days after the election. Merkley became the first Democrat to win this seat since 1960. And since Smith was the only Republican holding statewide office in Oregon at the time, this was the first time since 1860 that no Republicans won or held statewide office in Oregon.

This was one of the most competitive races during the 2008 United States Senate elections., and the race was the most expensive in Oregon history. As of late October 2008, advertising related to the race exceeded $27 million, outstripping the $15 million spent on a 2007 tobacco tax ballot measure and the $14.7 million spent in the gubernatorial election of 2006.

Democratic primary

Candidates 
 Jeff Merkley, Speaker of the Oregon House of Representatives
 Steve Novick, attorney
 Candy Neville, real estate broker
 Roger Obrist, construction worker
 Pavel Goberman, perennial candidate
 David Loera, doctor

Campaign 
In the Democratic primary, although Democrats held all statewide offices in Oregon, there was no clear Democratic challenger; former Oregon Gov. John Kitzhaber indicated early on that he was not interested. In January 2007, while the campaign was still in its infancy, Portland lawyer and political activist Steve Novick wrote a lengthy critique of Gordon Smith's record in the Portland Willamette Week. The article outlined a strategy to beat Smith, who Novick argued was actually more vulnerable than appeared. On April 18, 2007, Novick formally announced his candidacy for Senate.

By the end of May, both Congressmen Earl Blumenauer and Peter DeFazio had announced they were not interested in entering the race, depleting what was considered by many the "first-tier" list of candidates for the position leaving Democrats searching for more candidates. With no high-profile Democrats in the race, it was believed by that the most likely candidates would come from the state legislature. Since the legislature was still in session at the time it was considered unlikely that any prominent lawmakers would jump into the race until the end of June or later. Of those, Jeff Merkley, then Speaker of the Oregon House of Representatives was considered to be the most likely to challenge Smith due to rumors that he had been in talks with the Democratic Senatorial Campaign Committee (DSCC).

The rumors that Merkley was being courted by the DSCC were confirmed when it was reported that he had travelled to the East Coast to discuss a possible run at the invitation of Senator Charles Schumer of New York, who as chairman of the DSCC was in charge of recruiting possible challengers to take on Smith. Around the same time, State Senator Alan Bates from Jackson County was reported to be contemplating running for the Democratic nomination. Eventually Bates decided against running and on August 1, 2007, Merkley filed papers, officially entering the race.

Merkley and Novick gave back-to-back speeches at the yearly summit of the Democratic Party of Oregon in Sunriver. There Novick threw a political jab, challenging Merkley's statements that he had been an opponent of the war from the start by pointing to his support of a Republican-drafted non-binding resolution in 2003, two days after the invasion began, that praised President Bush for the invasion of Iraq and the efforts of the troops and prayed for their safety. The critique drew noticeably negative reactions from the crowd and Merkley won a straw poll at the summit, 103 to 50 for Novick.

Merkley went on to dismiss the criticism, pointing out that Legislative resolutions carry no force of law and are only statements of principle, that a legislator could freely pick and choose which parts of the resolution to support, and that he made clear that "you stand up and clarify what parts you're supporting and what parts you're opposed to and I did that more clearly than any member on the floor of the House."

By the end of November 2007, six Democratic candidates had filed papers to run for the seat: Novick, Merkley, real estate agent Candy Neville of Eugene, retired mental health counselor David Loera of Salem, retired construction worker Roger Obrist of Damascus, and perennial candidate Pavel Goberman of Beaverton. Some pointed discussions ensued among the candidates over a debate schedule and formats.

On January 22, 2008, four of the Democratic candidates had their first debate in Pendleton, Oregon hosted by the East Oregonian newspaper.

Merkley went on to defeat Novick and the four other candidates in the Democratic primary on May 20, 2008.

Results

Republican primary

Candidates 
 Gordon Leitch, ophthalmologist
 Gordon Smith, incumbent U.S. Senator

Results

General election

Candidates

Major 
 Jeff Merkley (D), Speaker of the State House
 Gordon Smith (R), incumbent U.S. Senator

Minor 
 David Brownlow (C), at its statewide nominating convention on June 7, 2008, the Constitution Party of Oregon named him as its Senate nominee.

Predictions

Polling

Results

County results 

Although Smith carried all but eight of Oregon's 36 counties, one of the counties he lost was Multnomah County, home to Portland. Ultimately, Merkley's 142,000-vote margin in Multnomah, his home county, proved too much for Smith to overcome; it was more than double Merkley's overall margin of 59,100 votes.

Constitution Party candidate David Brownlow was seen by some as a spoiler, as his number of votes was more than the margin between Merkley and Smith. Brownlow drew votes away from opponents of the Iraq War, which Smith supported.

See also 
 List of United States senators from Oregon
 2008 United States Senate elections
 2008 Oregon legislative election
 2008 United States presidential election in Oregon

References

External links 
 Elections Division from the Oregon Secretary of State
 U.S. Congress candidates for Oregon at Project Vote Smart
 Oregon U.S. Senate race from Congress.org
 Oregon U.S. Senate race from CQ Politics
 Oregon U.S. Senate race from The Green Papers
 Oregon U.S. Senate from OurCampaigns.com
 Oregon U.S. Senate race from 2008 Race Tracker
 Campaign contributions from OpenSecrets
 Smith (R-i) vs Merkley (D) graph of multiple polls from Pollster.com

2008
Oregon
United States Senate